Robert Yelverton Tyrrell, FBA (January 21, 1844 – September 19, 1914) was an Irish classical scholar who was Regius Professor of Greek at Trinity College, Dublin.

Biography
He was educated at Trinity College where he subsequently became a fellow in 1868 and professor of Latin in 1871. From 1869 he became the first editor of the literary magazine Kottabos. He also founded the "more solemn academic journal" Hermathena in 1873.

From 1880 to 1898, he was Regius professor of Greek, and from 1900 to 1904 professor of ancient history. He was a Commissioner of Education for Ireland and one of the original fellows of the British Academy. He was a first cousin to the disgraced modernist writer and excommunicated Catholic priest George Tyrrell SJ.

Works
Amongst his published works were:
 Hesperidum Susurri (1867), with Thomas J Bellingham Brady and Maxwell Cormac Cullinan+
 Contributions to Cottabos, a Trinity College, Dublin, magazine (from 1868)
 ΕΥΡΙΠΙΔΟΥ ΒΑΚΧΑΙ The Bacchae of Euripides with a revision of the text and a commentary (1871)
 a translation of The Acharnians of Aristophanes into English verse (1883)
 an edition of Cicero's Letters (7 vols., the later vols. with Dr. Purser, 1879-1900)
 "Dublin Translations into Greek and Latin Verse", editor (1890)
 Latin Poetry (1893)
 Sophocles (1897)
 Terence (1902)
 Echoes of Kottabos (with Sir E. Sullivan) (1906)
 Essays on Greek Literature (1909)

Notes

External links
 W. B. Stanford, "Robert Yelverton Tyrrell", Hermathena, No. 125, (Winter 1978), pp. 7–21.

References
 

1844 births
1914 deaths
Greek–English translators
19th-century translators
Fellows of the British Academy